Édouard Manès (1835-1898) was Governor General for Inde française in the Second French Colonial Empire and after Governor of Reunion, a French Indian Ocean island, under Third Republic.

Titles Held

Governors of French India
People of the French Third Republic